Zeke Dombrowski (born July 27, 1986 in Hales Corners, Wisconsin) is an American former soccer player.  he is employed by the City of West Allis, Wisconsin Fire Department as a Firefighter/Paramedic.

Career

College and Amateur
Dombrowski played college soccer at the University of Wisconsin–Milwaukee, playing in a total of 84 matches, ranking fifth overall in school history. He was named to the All-Horizon League First Team, was an ESPN The Magazine First Team All-District selection, a member of the Horizon Academic All-League Team and a First Team NCSAA All-North/Central Region Scholar as a senior.

During his college years Dombrowski also played with Des Moines Menace in the USL Premier Development League.

Professional
Dombrowski's professional career began when he signed for the Wilmington Hammerheads in 2009. He made his professional debut on April 25, 2009 in Wilmington's 2–2 opening day with the Charlotte Eagles.

Personal
Zeke is the one of the Dombrowski brothers, who are professional soccer players: Scott Dombrowski, Chad Dombrowski, Tighe Dombrowski and Neil Dombrowski.

Honors

Wilmington Hammerheads
USL Second Division Regular Season Champions (1): 2009

References

1986 births
Living people
People from Hales Corners, Wisconsin
American soccer players
Des Moines Menace players
Wilmington Hammerheads FC players
USL Second Division players
USL League Two players
Milwaukee Panthers men's soccer players
Soccer players from Wisconsin
Association football midfielders